In organic chemistry, the Swern oxidation, named after Daniel Swern, is a chemical reaction whereby a primary or secondary alcohol is oxidized to an aldehyde or ketone using oxalyl chloride, dimethyl sulfoxide (DMSO) and an organic base, such as triethylamine. It is one of the many oxidation reactions commonly referred to as 'activated DMSO' oxidations. The reaction is known for its mild character and wide tolerance of functional groups.

The by-products are dimethyl sulfide ((CH3)2S), carbon monoxide (CO), carbon dioxide (CO2) and—when triethylamine is used as base—triethylammonium chloride (Et3NHCl). Of the volatile by-products, dimethyl sulfide has a strong, pervasive odour and carbon monoxide is acutely toxic, so the reaction and the work-up needs to be performed in a fume hood. Dimethyl sulfide is a volatile liquid (B.P. 37 °C) with an unpleasant odour at even low concentrations.

Mechanism
The first step of the Swern oxidation is the low-temperature reaction of DMSO, 1a, formally as resonance contributor 1b, with oxalyl chloride, 2. The first intermediate, 3, quickly decomposes giving off carbon dioxide and carbon monoxide and producing chloro(dimethyl)sulfonium chloride, 4.

After addition of the alcohol 5, the chloro(dimethyl)sulfonium chloride 4 reacts with the alcohol to give the key alkoxysulfonium ion intermediate, 6. The addition of at least 2 equivalents of base — typically triethylamine — will deprotonate the alkoxysulfonium ion to give the sulfur ylide 7. In a five-membered ring transition state, the sulfur ylide 7 decomposes to give dimethyl sulfide and the desired carbonyl compound 8.

Variations
When using oxalyl chloride as the dehydration agent, the reaction must be kept colder than −60 °C to avoid side reactions. With cyanuric chloride or trifluoroacetic anhydride instead of oxalyl chloride, the reaction can be warmed to −30 °C without side reactions. Other methods for the activation of DMSO to initiate the formation of the key intermediate 6 are the use of carbodiimides (Pfitzner–Moffatt oxidation), a sulfur trioxide pyridine complex (Parikh–Doering oxidation) or acetic anhydride (Albright-Goldman oxidation). The intermediate 4 can also be prepared from dimethyl sulfide and N-chlorosuccinimide (the Corey–Kim oxidation).

In some cases, the use of triethylamine as the base can lead to epimerisation at the carbon alpha to the newly formed carbonyl. Using a bulkier base, such as diisopropylethylamine, can mitigate this side reaction.

Considerations
Dimethyl sulfide, a byproduct of the Swern oxidation, is one of the most notoriously unpleasant odors known in organic chemistry. Humans can detect this compound in concentrations as low as 0.02 to 0.1 parts per million. A simple remedy for this problem is to rinse used glassware with bleach or oxone solution, which will oxidize the dimethyl sulfide back to dimethyl sulfoxide or to dimethyl sulfone, both of which are odourless and nontoxic.

The reaction conditions allow oxidation of acid-sensitive compounds, which might decompose under the acidic oxidation conditions such as Jones oxidation.  For example, in Thompson & Heathcock's synthesis of the sesquiterpene isovelleral, the final step uses the Swern protocol, avoiding rearrangement of the acid-sensitive cyclopropanemethanol moiety.

See also
 Alcohol oxidation
 Sulfonium-based oxidation of alcohols to aldehydes
 Pyridinium chlorochromate
 Jones oxidation
 Oppenauer oxidation
 Pfitzner–Moffatt oxidation
 Parikh–Doering oxidation
 Albright-Goldman oxidation
 Corey–Kim oxidation
 Dess–Martin periodinane oxidation
 Ley oxidation (TPAP oxidation)
 TEMPO oxidation

References

External links
 Organic Chemistry Portal

Organic oxidation reactions
Name reactions